Dineshchandra Anavadiya is an Indian politician and a Member of Parliament in the Rajya Sabha from Gujarat. He was elected in a bypoll on 19 February 2021 due to the death of Ahmed Patel.He was also worked as President of Bakshipanch Morcha Gujarat State. He was former Director and Chairman of Gujarat State Road Transport Corporation. He is also member of Institute of Teaching and Research in Ayurveda in Jamnagar.

References

Living people
Year of birth missing (living people)
Bharatiya Janata Party politicians from Gujarat
Rajya Sabha members from Gujarat
People from Banaskantha district